Stråssa is a locality situated in Lindesberg Municipality, Örebro County, Sweden with 306 inhabitants in 2010.

External links 
 Stråssa byförening
 Stråssa

References 

Populated places in Örebro County
Populated places in Lindesberg Municipality